Lhachen Gyalpo  (Lha-chen-rgyal-po) (c. 1050-1080 CE)  was the fifth king of Ladakh. He is mentioned in the Ladakhi Chronicles. During his reign, important buildings like the Likir Monastery were built. He had a "brotherhood" of monks to settle there. He belongs to Nyima-Gon dynasty.

Also, by the three lakes near Gaṅs-ri (Kailash) there were at times a hundred and at other times five hundred recluses staying there and "he for a long time, with untiring zeal, provided [them] with the necessities of life."

Footnotes

References
 *Francke, A. H. 1914, 1926. Antiquities of Indian Tibet. Vol. 1: Personal Narrative; Vol. 2: The Chronicles of Ladak and Minor Chronicles, texts and translations, with Notes and Maps. Reprint 1972. S. Chand & Co., New Delhi.

Kings of Ladakh
1050s births
1080 deaths